The 2014 AFC U-16 Championship was the 16th edition of the biennial international youth football tournament organized by the Asian Football Confederation (AFC) for players aged 16 and below. Thailand were approved as hosts of the competition on 25 April 2013. The tournament was held from 6 to 20 September 2014, with the top four teams qualifying for the 2015 FIFA U-17 World Cup in Chile.

North Korea won the tournament, and were joined by South Korea, Australia, and Syria as AFC qualifiers for the 2015 FIFA U-17 World Cup.

Venues

Qualification

The draw for the qualifiers was held on 26 April 2013 in Kuala Lumpur, Malaysia.

Qualified teams

 
 
 
 
 
 
 
 
 
 
 
 
 
 
  (hosts)

Draw
The draw for the competition was held on 6 April 2014 in Bangkok, Thailand.

Group stage
The top two teams from each group advanced to the quarter-finals.

If two or more teams are equal on points on completion of the group matches, the following criteria were applied to determine the rankings.
 Greater number of points obtained in the group matches between the teams concerned;
 Goal difference resulting from the group matches between the teams concerned;
 Greater number of goals scored in the group matches between the teams concerned;
 Goal difference in all the group matches;
 Greater number of goals scored in all the group matches;
 Kicks from the penalty mark if only two teams are involved and they are both on the field of play;
 Fewer score calculated according to the number of yellow and red cards received in the group matches;
 Drawing of lots.

All times are local (UTC+7).

Group A

Group B

Group C

Group D

Knockout stage
In the knockout stage, penalty shoot-out is used to decide the winner if necessary (extra time is not used).

Quarter-finals

Semi-finals

Final

Winners

Qualified teams for FIFA U-17 World Cup
The following four teams from AFC qualify for the 2015 FIFA U-17 World Cup.

1 Bold indicates champions for that year. Italic indicates hosts for that year.
2 Australia qualified as a member of the OFC between 1985 and 2005.

Awards

Goalscorers
5 goals
 Lee Seung-woo

4 goals

 Cameron Joice
 Han Kwang-song
 Anas Al-Aji

3 goals

 Choe Song-hyok
 Hassan Palang
 Abd Al-Rahman Barakat
 Sukhrob Nurulloev

2 goals

 Jake Brimmer
 Reza Karimi
 Reza Shekari
 Suga Daiki
 Jong Chang-bom
 Muhammad Najmuddin
 Jang Gyeol-hee
 Mohammad Jaddoua
 Jonibek Kuchimov
 Mahmudxojiyev Shokhrukh

1 goal

 Daniel Arzani
 Jackson Bandiera
 Charlie Devereux
 Daniel Maskin
 Kosta Petratos
 Jamal Reiners
 Duan Liuyu
 He Xin
 Mohammad Shamsi
 Mohammad Soltanimehr
 Ryosuke Nagasawa
 Doan Ritsu
 Sasaki Takumi
 Yasui Takuya
 Onozawa Toshiki
 Salem Al-Bariki
 Abdulaziz Al-Hadiyah
 Khaled Mohammad
 Kogileswaran Raj
 Muhammad Syazwan
 Bimal Magar
 Kiran Sunar
 Ananta Tamang
 Ju Hyon-hyok
 Pak Yong-gwan
 Mohammad Al-Ubaidani
 Dhakil Al-Yahmadi
 Khalid Mazeed
 Mashhour Abdullah
 Khalid Dubaysh
 Choi Jae-young
 Hwang Tae-hyoen
 Jang Jae-won
 Kim Jung-min
 Lee Sang-heon
 Lee Sang-min
 Park Sang-hyeok
 You Ju-an
 Yu Seung-min
 Naeim Naem
 Samart Authairatsamee
 Saveliy Abramov
 Abdugani Ganijonov
 Khudoberdi Kholikov

Own goal
 Shabaib Al-Khaldi (playing against Nepal)

Tournament team rankings

References

External links
, the-AFC.com

 
U-16 Championship
International association football competitions hosted by Thailand
2014 in Thai football
2014 in youth association football
AFC U-16 Championships